The 2020 Tim Hortons Brier, Canada's national men's curling championship, was held from February 29 to March 8 at the Leon's Centre in Kingston, Ontario. The winning Brad Gushue rink was scheduled to represent Canada at the 2020 World Men's Curling Championship at the Commonwealth Arena in Glasgow, Scotland.

Newfoundland and Labrador's Brad Gushue rink won their third Brier Tankard by defeating Alberta's Brendan Bottcher rink 7–3 in the final.

On Tuesday, March 3, Saskatchewan skip Matt Dunstone curled two perfect games in the same day (Draws 10 & 11) against higher ranked teams Ontario (John Epping) and Canada (Kevin Koe). It was the first time a curler curled two perfect games in the same day in Canadian Men's Curling Championship history.

At the end of the Championship pool round on Friday March 6, four teams were tied for the fourth place berth in the playoffs, requiring 3 tiebreaker games to determine the final team eligible for the playoff round.

Teams
Source:

CTRS ranking

Wild card game
A wild card play-in game was played on February 28. It was contested between the top two teams on the Canadian Team Ranking System standings who did not win their respective provincial championships: the West St. Paul Curling Club's Mike McEwen rink from West St. Paul, Manitoba; and the Penetanguishene Curling Club's Glenn Howard rink from Penetanguishene, Ontario. Team Wild Card entered the Brier as the number 3 seed.

CTRS standings for wild card game

Wild card Game
Friday, February 28, 7:00 pm

Round-robin standings
Final round-robin standings

Round-robin results

All draw times are listed in Eastern Time Zone (UTC−05:00).

Draw 1
Saturday, February 29, 2:00 pm

Draw 2
Saturday, February 29, 7:00 pm

Draw 3
Sunday, March 1, 9:00 am

Draw 4
Sunday, March 1, 2:00 pm

Draw 5
Sunday, March 1, 7:00 pm

Draw 6
Monday, March 2, 9:00 am

Draw 7
Monday, March 2, 2:00 pm

Draw 8
Monday, March 2, 7:00 pm

Draw 9
Tuesday, March 3, 9:00 am

Draw 10
Tuesday, March 3, 2:00 pm

Draw 11
Tuesday, March 3, 7:00 pm

Draw 12
Wednesday, March 4, 9:00 am

Draw 13
Wednesday, March 4, 2:00 pm

Draw 14
Wednesday, March 4, 7:00 pm

Championship pool standings
The top four teams from each pool advance to the Championship pool. All wins and losses earned in the round robin will be carried forward into the Championship Pool. Wins in tiebreaker games are not carried forward.

Final Championship pool standings

Championship pool results

Draw 16
Thursday, March 5, 1:00 pm

Draw 17
Thursday, March 5, 7:00 pm

Draw 18
Friday, March 6, 1:00 pm

Draw 19
Friday, March 6, 7:00 pm

Tiebreakers

Saturday, March 7, 9:00 am

Saturday, March 7, 2:00 pm

Playoffs

1 vs. 2
Saturday, March 7, 2:00 pm

3 vs. 4
Saturday, March 7, 7:00 pm

Semifinal
Sunday, March 8, 12:00 pm

Final
Sunday, March 8, 7:00 pm

Statistics

Top 5 player percentages
After Championship Pool; minimum 5 games

Perfect games
Round robin and championship pool only

Awards
The awards and all-star teams are listed as follows:

All-Star Teams
First Team
Skip:  Brendan Bottcher, Alberta
Third:  Reid Carruthers, Team Wild Card
Second:  E.J. Harnden, Northern Ontario
Lead:  Colin Hodgson, Team Wild Card

Second Team
Skip:  Mike McEwen, Team Wild Card
Third:  Marc Kennedy, Northern Ontario
Second:  Derek Samagalski, Team Wild Card
Lead:  Ben Hebert, Team Canada

Ross Harstone Sportsmanship Award
 Colin Hodgson, Team Wild Card Lead

Paul McLean Award
Geoff Kamada and Shayne Dilling, TSN video editors

Hec Gervais Most Valuable Player Award
 Brad Gushue, Newfoundland and Labrador Skip

Final standings

Notes

References

External links

 
Brier
Curling in Ontario
Brier
Brier
Brier
Sport in Kingston, Ontario
The Brier